Akhurlu (also Romanized as Ākhūrlū; also known as Ākhvorlī) is a village in Churs Rural District, in the Central District of Chaypareh County, West Azerbaijan Province, Iran. At the 2006 census, its population was 66, in 17 families.

References 

Populated places in Chaypareh County